The 2015 World Rugby Under 20 Championship was the eighth annual international rugby union competition for Under 20 national teams. The event was organised for the second time in Italy by rugby's governing body, World Rugby. Twelve nations played in the tournament, with matches hosted by Parma, Viadana, Calvisano and Cremona, host city of the final match. England went into the tournament as the two-time defending champions after they successfully defended their title in the 2014 IRB Junior World Championship (as the tournament was known through 2014). This was the first U20 Championship held after the sport's governing body changed its name from the International Rugby Board to the current World Rugby.

New Zealand won the title after a 21–16 win against England in the final.

Venues
The championship was held across four locations. Parma, Viadana and Calvisano hosted pool matches, with the latter two hosting semi-finals for each bracket (teams 1–4, 5–8 and 9–12). Cremona hosted the final and two of the remaining positional play-offs, with Calvisano hosting the others.

Teams
The following teams participated in the 2015 World Rugby U20 Championship:

Match officials
The following officials oversaw the thirty matches:

 TMO Shaun Veldsman travelled to Italy for the semi-finals and the final.

Referees
  Matthew Carley (England)
  Gary Conway (Ireland)
  William Houston (Australia)
  Shuhei Kubo (Japan)
  Lloyd Linton (Scotland)
  Brendon Pickerill (New Zealand)
  Elia Rizzo (Italy)
  Juan Sylvestre (Argentina)
  Ben Whitehouse (Wales)

Reserve or Assistant Referees
  Carlo Damasco (Italy)
  Gianluigi Rossi (Italy)
  Stefano Pennè (Italy)
  Filippo Bertelli (Italy)
  Luca Trentin (Italy)
  Stefano Roscini (Italy)
  Francesco Russo (Italy)

Television match officials
  Shaun Veldsman (South Africa)

Pool stage
The playing schedule and pools were announced on 25 November 2014.

All times are in Central European Summer Time (UTC+2)

Points were awarded in the Pool Stage via the standard points system: 
 4 points for a win
 2 points for a draw
 1 bonus scoring point for scoring 4 or more tries
 1 bonus losing point for losing by 7 or less points
 0 points for a loss above 7 points

If at completion of the Pool Stage two or more teams were level on points, the following tiebreakers were applied:

 The winner of the Match in which the two tied Teams have played each other;
 The Team which has the best difference between points scored for and points scored against in all its Pool Matches;
 The Team which has the best difference between tries scored for and tries scored against in all its Pool Matches;
 The Team which has scored most points in all its Pool Matches;
 The Team which has scored most tries in all its Pool Matches; and
 If none of the above produce a result, then it will be resolved with a toss of a coin.

Pld = matches played, W = matches won, D = draws, L = losses, PF = match points for, PA = match points against, PD = Points difference between match points for and match points against, TF = tries for, TA = tries against, BP = bonus points, Pts = pool points

Pool A
{| class="wikitable" style="text-align: center;"
|-
!width="200"|Team
!width="20"|Pld
!width="20"|W
!width="20"|D
!width="20"|L
!width="20"|PF
!width="20"|PA
!width="32"|PD
!width="20"|TF
!width="20"|TA
!width="20"|BP
!width="20"|Pts
|-style="background:#ccffcc"
|align=left| 
| 3 || 3 || 0 || 0 || 96 || 35 || +61 || 13 || 4 || 1 || 13
|-style="background:#ccffcc"
|align=left| 
| 3 || 2 || 0 || 1 || 107 || 53 || +54 || 15 || 6 || 2 || 10
|-style="background:#ffe6bd"
|align=left| 
| 3 || 1 || 0 || 2 || 92 || 52 || +40 || 12 || 7 || 1 || 5
|-style="background:#fcc"
|align=left| 
| 3 || 0 || 0 || 3 || 17 || 172 || –155 || 2 || 26 || 0 || 0
|-
|}

Pool B
{| class="wikitable" style="text-align: center;"
|-
!width="200"|Team
!width="20"|Pld
!width="20"|W
!width="20"|D
!width="20"|L
!width="20"|PF
!width="20"|PA
!width="20"|PD
!width="20"|TF
!width="20"|TA
!width="20"|BP
!width="20"|Pts
|-style="background:#ccffcc"
|align=left| 
| 3 || 3 || 0 || 0 || 119 || 26 || +93 || 16 || 4 || 3 || 15
|-style="background:#ffe6bd"
|align=left| 
| 3 || 2 || 0 || 1 || 78 || 83 || –5 || 11 || 11 || 2 || 10
|-style="background:#fcc"
|align=left| 
| 3 || 1 || 0 || 2 || 60 || 98 || –38 || 7 || 14 || 0 || 4
|-style="background:#fcc"
|align=left| 
| 3 || 0 || 0 || 3 || 44 || 94 || –50 || 7 || 12 || 2 || 2
|}

Pool C
{| class="wikitable" style="text-align: center;"
|-
!width="200"|Team
!width="20"|Pld
!width="20"|W
!width="20"|D
!width="20"|L
!width="20"|PF
!width="20"|PA
!width="20"|PD
!width="20"|TF
!width="20"|TA
!width="20"|BP
!width="20"|Pts
|-style="background:#ccffcc"
|align=left| 
| 3 || 3 || 0 || 0 || 125 || 42 || +83 || 16 || 3 || 2 || 14
|-style="background:#ffe6bd"
|align=left| 
| 3 || 2 || 0 || 1 || 45 || 61 || –16 || 2 || 6 || 0 || 8
|-style="background:#ffe6bd"
|align=left| 
| 3 || 1 || 0 || 2 || 59 || 98 || –39 || 6 || 11 || 1 || 5
|-style="background:#fcc"
|align=left| 
| 3 || 0 || 0 || 3 || 51 || 79 || –28 || 3 || 7 || 2 || 2
|}

Standings after pool stage

Knockout stage

9–12th place play-offs

Semi-finals

11th place game

9th place game

5–8th place play-offs

Semi-finals

7th place game

5th place game

Finals

Semi-finals

3rd place game

Final

References

External links
Official website

2015
2015 rugby union tournaments for national teams
2014–15 in Italian rugby union
International rugby union competitions hosted by Italy
rugby union